Sorjonen is a Finnish surname. Notable people with the surname include:

People
  (1908–1954), Finnish criminal
  (b. 1942), Finnish business director and cultural patron
  (1912–1996), Finnish journalist, rebel and author
  (b. 1956), Professor of Finnish
 , Finnish hockey player
  (1904–1970), Finnish teacher and association leader

Fictional characters and series
 Bordertown (Finnish TV series), a Finnish television series known as "Sorjonen" in Finnish
 Kari Sorjonen, main character in Bordertown

Finnish-language surnames